This list concerns the monarchs of Partitioned Poland, from 1795 and 19th- and early-20th-century claimants to the Polish throne. For the historical monarchs of Poland until 1795, see List of Polish monarchs.

Kings of the Kingdom of Poland

Kings and queens of Galicia and Lodomeria (Galicja)

Dukes of Warsaw (Warszawa)

Dukes of Danzig (Gdańsk)

Grand Dukes of Posen (Poznań)

Bibliography 
 Grodziski S., Polska w czasach przełomu (1764-1815), Kraków 2001. 

Rulers
 Partitioned
Poland Partitioned